Harold G. Overstreet (born December 1944) is a retired United States Marine who served as the 12th Sergeant Major of the Marine Corps from 1991 to 1995.

Military career
Overstreet was born in December 1944 in Houston, Texas. He entered the United States Marine Corps in June 1966 and completed recruit training at Marine Corps Recruit Depot San Diego, followed by Basic Infantry Training School at Marine Corps Base Camp Pendleton.

Upon completion of training, Overstreet reported to staging battalion at Camp Pendleton, for further assignment to the 1st Military Police Battalion, 3rd Marine Division, Republic of Vietnam. Returning to the states, he was reassigned to the infantry training regiment at Camp Pendleton. He subsequently completed successful tours on the inspector-instructor staff, Wichita, Kansas; recruiting duty in Des Moines, Iowa, and Detroit, Michigan; and finally returned to MCRD San Diego in various drill instructor roles: junior drill instructor, senior drill instructor, series gunnery sergeant, and chief instructor. Reassigned to the Drill Instructor School, he was an instructor, drill master, and chief instructor.

After completing First Sergeant School, Overstreet was assigned to Special Projects at Drill Instructor School, where he undertook the task of completely transferring the Drill Manual onto video tape for a more optimal use during instructional periods. His promotion to first sergeant in February 1979 led to his second assignment on Okinawa as the first sergeant for Headquarters and Service Company, 9th Engineer Support Battalion. Upon his return from overseas, he was the first sergeant of both Companies B and C, 1st Battalion 4th Marines at Marine Corps Air Ground Combat Center Twentynine Palms.

Promoted to sergeant major in October 1983, Overstreet became the inspector sergeant major at MCAGCC Twentynine Palms. Returning to Marine Corps Recruit Depot San Diego, he served as a battalion and regimental sergeant major in the Recruit Training Regiment. Transferring to Marine Corps Base Camp Lejeune, he served as the 6th Marine Regiment's sergeant major. This assignment was followed by duty as sergeant major for the 12th Marine Regiment, on Okinawa. On 6 April 1990, Sergeant Major Overstreet was posted as depot sergeant major at San Diego. He was selected as the 12th Sergeant Major of the Marine Corps in April 1991, and assumed the post on 28 June 1991. He retired in 1995.

Later life
In February 2007, Overstreet founded Veterans Direct Inc., a Texas (C) corporation and launched Veteran Caskets and Marine Caskets. He is now on the board of directors for the Young Marines and the Executive Director of Veteran Forces, an IRS approved 501c3 non-profit charity. He currently serves on the board of directors for the Scholastic Shooting Sports Foundation.

Awards and decorations
Sergeant Major Overstreet's personal decorations include:
 

7 Service stripes.

References

Sergeant Major Harold G. Overstreet, USMC (Retired), Who's Who in Marine Corps History, History Division, United States Marine Corps. (Official Marine Corps biography)

1944 births
Living people
People from Houston
Sergeants Major of the Marine Corps
United States Marine Corps personnel of the Vietnam War